The main roads in Northern Ireland are signed "M"/"A"/"B" as in Great Britain. Whereas the roads in Great Britain are numbered according to a zonal system, there is no available explanation for the allocation of road numbers in Northern Ireland, though their numbering is separate from the system in England, Scotland and Wales.

In Northern Ireland, DfI Roads is responsible for all  of roads. Road users also have the Highway Code for Northern Ireland, which provide guidance on the legal aspects of driving on Northern Ireland's roads.

Motorways
The most important roads are motorways, designated by the letter "M". The motorway network is focused on Belfast. Legal authority for motorways existed in the Special Roads Act of 1963 similar to that in the Special Roads Act 1949 in Great Britain. The first motorway to open was the M1 motorway, though it did so under temporary powers until the Special Roads Act had been passed. Work on the motorways continued until the 1970s when the oil crisis and The Troubles both intervened causing the abandonment of many schemes. The M3 was the final motorway scheme in Northern Ireland and the United Kingdom in its entirety to open.

"A" roads

The next most important roads are designated with the prefix "A" and a one-, two- or three-digit number.

"B" roads

Less important roads are indicated with the prefix "B" and a one-, two- or three- digit number.

"C" roads
Minor roads can be indicated with the prefix "C" and a one-, two- or three- digit number, though it is very rare to see these marked on signposts or Ordnance Survey maps

Euro Routes
Though unsignposted, the following Euro Routes include sections of roads in Northern Ireland:

E01 – Larne – Belfast – Dublin – Rosslare – A Coruña – Pontevedra – Valença do Minho – Vila Real de Santo António – Huelva – Sevilla
E16 – Derry – Belfast ... Glasgow – Edinburgh ... Bergen – Arna – Voss ... Lærdal – Tyin – Fagernes – Hønefoss – Sandvika – Oslo
 E18 – Craigavon – Belfast – Larne ... Stranraer – Gretna – Carlisle – Newcastle ... Kristiansand – Arendal – Porsgrunn – Larvik – Sandefjord – Horten – Drammen – Oslo – Askim – Karlstad – Örebro – Västerås – Stockholm/Kapellskär ... Mariehamn ... Turku/Naantali – Helsinki – Kotka – Vaalimaa – Vyborg – Saint Petersburg

See also
Roads in the United Kingdom
Roads in the Republic of Ireland
Local roads in Ireland
History of roads in Ireland
Northern Irish Vehicle Registration Plates
Transport in Ireland

References

 
Nor